Sprague is a small city in Lincoln County, Washington, United States. The population was 446 at the 2010 census. The city was platted in 1880 and named for former American Civil War Union general John Wilson Sprague.

History

Sprague was first settled by William Newman, who established an inn at the location.

Sprague was officially incorporated on November 28, 1883.  Originally called Hoodooville after William Burrows, a local character called Hoodoo Billy, the name was changed to honor General John W. Sprague, a railroad executive.

Sprague was destroyed by fire on August 3, 1895. The fire and subsequent decision by the Northern Pacific Railroad to not rebuild in the town resulted in the relocation of the county seat, held by Sprague after an election in 1884, to Davenport in 1896 after a controversial vote.

Mary Queen of Heaven Catholic Church in Sprague, Washington was originally built in 1883. The current church was built in a Gothic Revival style and erected in 1902, just south of the site of the original church and blessed by the Bishop of Nesqually. It was placed on the National Register of Historic Places by the U.S. Department of Interior in 1990.

Geography
Sprague is located at  (47.298974, -117.977532). It is at the junction of Interstate 90 and State Route 23, northeast of Sprague Lake.

Climate
According to the Köppen climate classification system, Sprague is located in the transition zone between a dry-summer humid continental climate, and a semi-arid climate.

Demographics

2010 census
As of the census of 2010, there were 447 people, 197 households, and 128 families residing in the city. The racial makeup of the city was 94.2% White, 2.0% Native American, 1.6% Asian, 0.4% from other races, and 1.8% from two or more races. Hispanic or Latino of any race were 3.6% of the population.

There were 197 households, of which 26.4% had children under the age of 18 living with them, 51.8% were married couples living together, 9.1% had a female householder with no husband present, 4.1% had a male householder with no wife present, and 35.0% were non-families. 32.5% of all households were made up of individuals, and 15.2% had someone living alone who was 65 years of age or older. The average household size was 2.26 and the average family size was 2.81.

The median age in the city was 46.5 years. 23.1% of residents were under the age of 18; 4.9% were between the ages of 18 and 24; 19.9% were from 25 to 44; 32.5% were from 45 to 64; and 19.5% were 65 years of age or older. The gender makeup of the city was 51.1% male and 48.9% female.

2000 census
As of the census of 2000, there were 490 people, 216 households, and 130 families residing in the city. The population density was 780.8 people per square mile (300.3/km2). There were 242 housing units at an average density of 385.6 per square mile (148.3/km2). The racial makeup of the city was 93.47% White, 2.65% Native American, 0.41% Asian, 1.63% from other races, and 1.84% from two or more races. Hispanic or Latino of any race were 2.65% of the population.

There were 216 households, out of which 26.4% had children under the age of 18 living with them, 49.5% were married couples living together, 7.4% had a female householder with no husband present, and 39.4% were non-families. 32.9% of all households were made up of individuals, and 14.4% had someone living alone who was 65 years of age or older. The average household size was 2.27 and the average family size was 2.92.

In the city, the population was spread out, with 24.5% under the age of 18, 6.5% from 18 to 24, 21.6% from 25 to 44, 26.3% from 45 to 64, and 21.0% who were 65 years of age or older. The median age was 43 years. For every 100 females, there were 95.2 males. For every 100 females age 18 and over, there were 91.7 males.

The median income for a household in the city was $29,079, and the median income for a family was $31,750. Males had a median income of $30,833 versus $21,875 for females. The per capita income for the city was $15,912. About 8.9% of families and 13.2% of the population were below the poverty line, including 21.4% of those under age 18 and 6.6% of those age 65 or over.

Notable people
Scott Buchanan (1895-1968), American philosopher and educator
Eugene E. Lindsey, World War II naval pilot

References

External links
City website
Sprague Public Library

Cities in Lincoln County, Washington
Cities in Washington (state)